Combs-la-Ville–Quincy is a RER station in Combs-la-Ville, Seine-et-Marne, Île-de-France, France. The station was opened on 12 August 1849 and is on the Paris–Marseille railway. The RER Line D, which is operated by the SNCF, serves the station.

Station Info
Now standing at an altitude of 81 meters above sea level, Combs-la-Ville–Quincy station is at the 25.896-kilometer point of the Paris-Marseille railway, in between the stations of Boussy-Saint-Antoine and Lieusaint–Moissy. In 2014, 3,866,400 people used the station, and in 2016, the station served 4,228,200 passengers.

Train Services
The following RER D train services serve the station:
Local services (RER D) Goussainville–Saint-Denis–Gare de Lyon–Villeneuve-Saint-Georges–Combs-la-Ville–Quincy–Melun
Local services (RER D) Gare de Lyon–Creteil-Pompadour–Villeneuve-Saint-Georges–Combs-la-Ville–Quincy–Melun

References

External links
 
 

Railway stations in Seine-et-Marne
Réseau Express Régional stations
Railway stations in France opened in 1849